Michel Prévost (September 30, 1753 – July 17, 1843) was a merchant and political figure in Lower Canada. He represented Leinster in the Legislative Assembly of Lower Canada from 1815 to 1816 and from 1820 to 1824 as a supporter of the Parti canadien.

He was born in Montreal, the son of Eustache Prévost and Marie-Jeanne Valade. In 1789, he married Félicité Bourdon. Around the same time, he established himself as a miller and merchant at Saint-Jacques-de-l'Achigan (later Saint-Jacques). Prévost served as a captain in the militia during the War of 1812, later reaching the rank of major. He was first elected to the assembly in an 1815 by-election held after the election of Jacques Trullier, dit Lacombe was overturned. He died in Montreal at the age of 89.

References 

1753 births
1843 deaths
Members of the Legislative Assembly of Lower Canada
People from Montreal